Gluviopsona is a genus of daesiid camel spiders, first described by Carl Friedrich Roewer in 1933.

Species 
, the World Solifugae Catalog accepts the following three species:

 Gluviopsona lahavi Levy & Shulov, 1964 — Israel
 Gluviopsona nova Turk, 1960 — Jordan
 Gluviopsona persica (Birula, 1905) — Iran

References 

Arachnid genera
Solifugae